Charles Jacques Le Vavasseur (19 January 1892 – 8 January 1960) was a French modern pentathlete and equestrian. He competed at the 1924 and 1928 Summer Olympics.

References

External links
 

1892 births
1960 deaths
French male modern pentathletes
Olympic modern pentathletes of France
Modern pentathletes at the 1924 Summer Olympics
Modern pentathletes at the 1928 Summer Olympics
French male equestrians
Olympic equestrians of France
Equestrians at the 1924 Summer Olympics